President Barack Obama Boulevard, or commonly Obama Boulevard, is a major thoroughfare in the Baldwin Hills/Crenshaw area of the city of Los Angeles. It stretches  from Baldwin Hills (past Baldwin Village and Crenshaw) to Leimert Park.

History
Previously  called Rodeo Road (pronounced "rodeo" (RO-dee-oh)  and not to be confused with Rodeo Drive (ro-DAY-oh) in Beverly Hills), it was renamed President Barack Obama Boulevard on May 4, 2019. The Los Angeles Times characterized the renaming as important for local residents because it honored the first African American President and was a symbol of resistance to the Donald Trump presidency. The city already has streets named after U.S. presidents, such as George Washington, John Adams, Abraham Lincoln and Thomas Jefferson, as well as a street named for Reverend Dr. Martin Luther King Jr.—the former "Santa Barbara Avenue", thus renamed, and commonly known since the early 1980s as "King Boulevard". Then-Senator Obama held a campaign rally at Rancho Cienega Park when running for his first term as president.

Commercial

The former Rodeo Road's intersection with La Brea Avenue has been a commercial nexus since the mid-20th century, with the Baldwin Hills Shopping Center (not to be confused with the larger Baldwin Hills Crenshaw Plaza indoor mall) opening in 1954 with anchors Safeway, Clark's Drug Store (later became Sav-On Drugs in 1995) and J. J. Newberry; today the anchor tenants are Ralphs supermarket and CVS Pharmacy. The La Cienega–Rodeo Shopping Center had the Fedco warehouse club as an anchor, and is now anchored by Target. From the intersection of Obama and Crenshaw Boulevards, a commercial strip stretches down Crenshaw Boulevard to the Baldwin Hills Crenshaw Plaza.

References

Streets in Los Angeles
African-American history in Los Angeles
Baldwin Hills, Los Angeles
Crenshaw, Los Angeles
Barack Obama